Darbidan (also Romanized as Darbīdān) is a village in Amjaz Rural District, in the Central District of Anbarabad County, Kerman Province, Iran. At the 2006 census, its population was 31, in 7 families.

References 

Populated places in Anbarabad County